This article shows the rosters of all participating teams at the 2017 Memorial of Hubert Jerzy Wagner in Kraków, Poland.

The following is the Canadian roster in the 2017 Memorial of Hubert Jerzy Wagner.

The following is the French roster in the 2017 Memorial of Hubert Jerzy Wagner.

The following is the Polish roster in the 2017 Memorial of Hubert Jerzy Wagner.

The following is the Russian roster in the 2017 Memorial of Hubert Jerzy Wagner.

References

External links
Official website

Memorial of Hubert Jerzy Wagner squads